Sergei Bragin (born 19 March 1967 in Tallinn) is a former Estonian professional footballer. He was playing the position of central midfielder.

References

External links

1967 births
Living people
Footballers from Tallinn
Soviet footballers
Estonian footballers
Estonia international footballers
Estonian people of Russian descent
FC TVMK players
FCI Levadia Tallinn players
FC Lantana Tallinn players
FC Norma Tallinn players
Meistriliiga players
Estonian expatriate footballers
Expatriate footballers in Finland
Estonian expatriate sportspeople in Finland
Expatriate footballers in Belgium
Estonian expatriate sportspeople in Belgium
Association football midfielders